Piercarlo Ghinzani (born 16 January 1952) is a former racing driver from Italy.  He currently manages his own racing team, Team Ghinzani, which was created in 1992 and is currently involved in several Formula Three championships.

Early career
Before his Formula One career, Ghinzani raced between 1976 and 1979 with Team Euroracing, in several Formula Three championships such as the European Championship which he won in 1977, the Italian Championship which he won in 1979 and the British Championship. He also raced in Formula 2 in 1978.

Formula One career

He participated in 111 Formula One Grands Prix, debuting on 17 May at the 1981 Belgian Grand Prix at Zolder. He qualified for 77 of those, and started 74. He spent much of the 1980s racing for the small Osella team, and he only ever achieved one points finish. Ghinzani explained his continued association with unsuccessful teams such as Osella by saying it was better to be in Formula One, even at the back of the grid, than it was not being in it.

After qualifying 20th for the second race of the season at Kyalami in South African, he crashed in the morning warm-up at high speed through the Jukskei Sweep. His Osella hit the wall and with almost a full fuel load of 220 litres, went up in flames and he suffered burns to his hands and face that kept him out of the race. He recovered to take his only career points when he finished fifth at the 1984 Dallas Grand Prix in a race marked by high attrition, crumbling tarmac and oppressive heat.

Despite the competitiveness of the car (Fabi managed to put his car on pole in Germany), Ghinzani suffered reliability problems and was unable to register a finish for the team. In  he returned to Osella which brought predictable results in a car that was based on a 1983 design and with a turbocharged Alfa Romeo V8 engine that was unreliable, only moderately powerful and hard on fuel.

For  he was contracted to the Ligier team, alongside former Grand Prix winner René Arnoux. The team planned to run the new turbocharged 4 cylinder Alfa Romeo engines, but those plans were suddenly scuppered by Arnoux's scathing pre-season comments that likened the engine to dog food and gave Alfa's parent company Fiat the excuse they needed to pull the plug on the engine project. This forced the team to hastily adapt their cars to fit Megatron engines, though luckily both were 4-cylinder and almost the same size (the Megatron was actually the BMW engine used by Brabham and previously by Arrows and Benetton, but as BMW had pulled out of F1 at the beginning of the season, Arrows and their sponsors, USF&G, bought the remaining engines from BMW and renamed them "Megatron"). However, while both were 4-cylinder engines, their respective 'plumbing' was completely different, forcing the team to miss the opening race of the season in Brazil while the rear suspension was re-designed to fit the new engine. Ghinzani occasionally ran in the points for Ligier, notably in Germany, but suffered the indignity of being excluded at Silverstone from the British Grand Prix.

In  Ghinzani drove for the small German Zakspeed team, which ran its own 4 cylinder turbo engine, though generally without success, and his best finish for the year was 14th in the German Grand Prix at a wet Hockenheim (his teammate, young German Bernd Schneider finished 12th in the race, the best finish for the team in 1988). Despite being one of the few teams to use turbo powered engines in 1988, Ghinzani and Schneider often struggled to qualify for races and were often slower than the atmospheric cars. One such time was at the ultra fast Silverstone Circuit for the British Grand Prix. Neither driver qualified, with Ghinzani six seconds and Schneider eight seconds slower than the pole sitting Ferrari of Gerhard Berger.

For  he once again linked with Osella as teammate to young Italian driver Nicola Larini.

Ghinzani announced his decision to retire from Grand Prix racing before official practice of the final race of the 1989 season in Australia. He qualified 21st for his final race, but it ended when his Osella was violently hit from behind by the Lotus of triple World Champion Nelson Piquet on lap 19 under braking for the hairpin at the end of the fast Brabham Straight. Piquet, whose helmet was hit by one of the Osella's rear wheels but who was not hurt, stated that he simply had not seen Ghinzani until he hit him due to the amount of spray. During the race, 1989 World Champion Alain Prost refused to drive more than one lap in protest of the dangerous conditions caused by persistent and heavy rain.

Piercarlo Ghinzani also holds the record for the most Formula One appearances without qualifying in the top ten.

Racing record

Complete 24 Hours of Le Mans results

Complete Formula One World Championship results
(key)

† Did not finish, but was classified as he had completed more than 90% of the race distance.

References 

1952 births
Sportspeople from the Province of Bergamo
Living people
Italian racing drivers
Italian Formula One drivers
British Formula One Championship drivers
European Formula Two Championship drivers
FIA European Formula 3 Championship drivers
Italian Formula Three Championship drivers
A1 Grand Prix team owners
24 Hours of Le Mans drivers
Osella Formula One drivers
Toleman Formula One drivers
Ligier Formula One drivers
Zakspeed Formula One drivers
World Sportscar Championship drivers
Japanese Sportscar Championship drivers
Motorsport team owners
Team Joest drivers